Murayama may refer to:

Murayama (surname)
Murayama, Yamagata, a city in Japan